Monascella is a genus of fungi within the Onygenaceae family. This is a monotypic genus, containing the single species Monascella botryosa.

References

External links
Monascella at Index Fungorum

Onygenales
Monotypic Eurotiomycetes genera